A. G. Paul Palén (4 April 1881 – 12 October 1944) was a Swedish sport shooter who competed in the 1912 Summer Olympics. He won the gold medal as member of the Swedish team in the 30 m military pistol event and a silver medal in the rapid fire pistol competition. He also participated in the 50 metre pistol event and finished 36th.

References

External links
profile

1881 births
1944 deaths
Swedish male sport shooters
ISSF pistol shooters
Olympic shooters of Sweden
Shooters at the 1912 Summer Olympics
Olympic gold medalists for Sweden
Olympic silver medalists for Sweden
Olympic medalists in shooting
Medalists at the 1912 Summer Olympics
19th-century Swedish people
20th-century Swedish people